Mete Erpek (born 6 September 1987), better known by his stage name Joker, is a Turkish rapper and songwriter.

Life and career 
Born in Eskişehir on September 6, 1987, Mete Erpek became acquainted with hip hop culture thanks to the breakdancing videos and tapes he acquired from Bulgaria in 2002. He dealt with graffiti for 2 years, established his own studio in 2004 and started making rap music as an amateur under the name "Narkoza a.k.a. Stanley". He released his first amateur album, Narkoz a.k.a. Stanley, in 2005. In addition, the song "Mutluluk Tohumları" entered the top 10 in a demo contest. This success led him to join a group called Darp in Istanbul. He worked here for a year and then left the band. After attending university in Burdur for a while, he returned to Eskişehir. He took part in the albums of Battery Records and Allâme. In particular, they attracted attention with the song "Dünya İnanmıyor", which they included in the compilation album called Organize Oluyoruz 2 with Allâme. Joker announced on 11 December 11 2012 on Facebook that he was leaving Battery Records. He worked with important names of Turkish rap music such as Ceza and Sansar Salvo in his album Rhymestein, which he released in 2013. He founded his own studio, Hiphopjobz, in 2014. Released on 20 November 2015 with the label Dokuz Sekiz Müzik, was the album Microphone Show. He participated as a contestant in O Ses Türkiye on 25 December 2016 and reached the quarter finals. On 10 August 2018, he released his second album, Element, by the Sony Music label. He thinks it is wrong to associate rap music with drugs.

Discography

Under the name Narkoz a.k.a. Stanley

Under the name Joker

References 

Living people
1987 births
Turkish rappers
Turkish hip hop
Turkish lyricists
People from Eskişehir
21st-century Turkish male singers